The 2018 Seattle Sounders FC season was the club's tenth season in Major League Soccer, the United States' top-tier of professional soccer. The Sounders finished their previous season as MLS Cup runners-up, losing 2–0 to Toronto FC. The 2018 season was Brian Schmetzer's second full MLS season as head coach of the Sounders.

Background

Current roster

Out on loan

Competitions

Preseason

Friendlies

Major League Soccer

League tables

Western Conference

Overall

Results

MLS Cup Playoffs

Western Conference Semifinals

CONCACAF Champions League

Round of 16

Quarter-finals

U.S. Open Cup

Statistics

Appearances and goals 

Numbers after plus-sign(+) denote appearances as a substitute.

|-
|colspan="14"|Players who left the club during the season:

[S2] – S2 player

Top scorers 
{| class="wikitable" style="font-size: 95%; text-align: center;"
|-
!width=30|Rank
!width=30|Position
!width=30|Number
!width=175|Name
!width=75|
!width=75|
!width=75|
!width=75|
!width=75|Total
|-
|rowspan="1"|1
|FW
|9
|align=left| Raúl Ruidíaz
|10
|3
|0
|0
|13
|-
|rowspan="1"|2
|MF
|10
|align=left| Nicolás Lodeiro
|8
|1
|0
|2
|11
|-
|rowspan="1"|3
|FW
|17
|align=left| Will Bruin
|7
|0
|0
|1
|8
|-
|rowspan="2"|4
|MF
|8
|align=left| Víctor Rodríguez
|5
|0
|0
|0
|5
|-
|DF
|14
|align=left| Chad Marshall
|4
|0
|0
|1
|5
|-
|rowspan="2"|6
|MF
|7
|align=left| Cristian Roldan
|4
|0
|0
|0
|4
|-
|FW
|19
|align=left| Harry Shipp
|3
|0
|1
|0
|4
|-
|rowspan="1"|8
|MF
|4
|align=left| Gustav Svensson
|3
|0
|0
|0
|3
|-
|rowspan="3"|9
|FW
|2
|align=left| Clint Dempsey
|1
|0
|0
|1
|2
|-
|MF
|22
|align=left| Magnus Wolff Eikrem
|1
|0
|0
|1
|2
|-
|-
|FW
|70
|align=left| Handwalla Bwana
|2
|0
|0
|0
|2
|-
|rowspan="1"|12
|MF
|21
|align=left| Jordy Delem
|1
|0
|0
|0
|1
|-

Top assists 
{| class="wikitable" style="font-size: 95%; text-align: center;"
|-
!width=30|Rank
!width=30|Position
!width=30|Number
!width=175|Name
!width=75|
!width=75|
!width=75|
!width=75|
!width=75|Total
|-
|rowspan="1"|1
|MF
|10
|align=left| Nicolás Lodeiro
|16
|0
|0
|2
|18
|-
|rowspan="1"|2
|MF
|7
|align=left| Cristian Roldan
|9
|1
|0
|0
|10
|-
|rowspan="1"|3
|MF
|8
|align=left| Víctor Rodríguez
|6
|0
|0
|0
|6
|-
|rowspan="2"|4
|FW
|17
|align=left| Will Bruin
|5
|0
|0
|0
|5
|-
|DF
|18
|align=left| Kelvin Leerdam
|5
|0
|0
|0
|5
|-
|rowspan="3"|6
|MF
|19
|align=left| Harry Shipp
|3
|0
|0
|0
|3
|-
|MF
|6
|align=left| Osvaldo Alonso
|3
|0
|0
|0
|3
|-
|FW
|2
|align=left| Clint Dempsey
|1
|0
|0
|2
|3
|-
|rowspan="10"|9
|DF
|11
|align=left| Brad Smith
|1
|0
|0
|0
|1
|-
|FW
|70
|align=left| Handwalla Bwana
|1
|0
|0
|0
|1
|-
|DF
|90
|align=left| Waylon Francis
|1
|0
|0
|0
|1
|-
|MF
|22
|align=left| Magnus Wolff Eikrem
|1
|0
|0
|0
|1
|-
|MF
|16
|align=left| Alex Roldan
|1
|0
|0
|0
|1
|-
|FW
|9
|align=left| Raúl Ruidíaz
|1
|0
|0
|0
|1
|-
|DF
|5
|align=left| Nouhou
|1
|0
|0
|0
|1
|-
|MF
|4
|align=left| Gustav Svensson
|1
|0
|0
|0
|1
|-
|DF
|14
|align=left| Chad Marshall
|1
|0
|0
|0
|1
|-
|MF
|16
|align=left| Henry Wingo
|0
|0
|0
|1
|1
|-

Disciplinary record 
{| class="wikitable" style="text-align:center;"
|-
| rowspan="2" !width=15|
| rowspan="2" !width=15|
| rowspan="2" !width=120|Player
| colspan="3"|MLS
| colspan="3"|MLS Playoffs
| colspan="3"|U.S. Open Cup
| colspan="3"|CONCACAF Champions League
| colspan="3"|Total
|-
!width=34; background:#fe9;|
!width=34; background:#fe9;|
!width=34; background:#ff8888;|
!width=34; background:#fe9;|
!width=34; background:#fe9;|
!width=34; background:#ff8888;|
!width=34; background:#fe9;|
!width=34; background:#fe9;|
!width=34; background:#ff8888;|
!width=34; background:#fe9;|
!width=34; background:#fe9;|
!width=34; background:#ff8888;|
!width=34; background:#fe9;|
!width=34; background:#fe9;|
!width=34; background:#ff8888;|
|-
|-
|| 2 || |FW ||align=left| Clint Dempsey || |1|| |0|| |1|| |0|| |0|| |0|| |0|| |0|| |0|| |2|| |0|| |0|||3|| |0|| |1
|-
|-
|| 4 || |MF ||align=left| Gustav Svensson || |2|| |0|| |0|| |1|| |0|| |0|| |0|| |0|| |0|| |1|| |0|| |0|||4|| |0|| |0
|-
|-
|| 5 || |DF ||align=left| Nouhou || |8|| |0|| |0|| |0|| |0|| |0|| |0|||0|| |0|| |0|| |0|| |0|||8|| |0|| |0
|-
|-
|| 6 || |MF ||align=left| Osvaldo Alonso || |6|| |0|| |0|| |1|| |0|| |0|| |0|| |0|| |0|| |0|| |0|| |0|||7|| |0|| |0
|-
|-
|| 7 || |MF ||align=left| Cristian Roldan || |4|| |0|| |0|| |0|| |0|| |0|| |0|| |0|| |0|| |0|| |0|| |0|||4|| |0|| |0
|-
|-
|| 9 || |FW ||align=left| Raúl Ruidíaz || |1|| |0|| |0|| |1|| |0|| |0|| |0|| |0|| |0|| |0|| |0|| |0|||2|| |0|| |0
|-
|-
|| 10 || |MF ||align=left| Nicolás Lodeiro || |3|| |0|| |0|| |0|| |0|| |0|| |0|| |0|| |0|| |0|| |0|| |0|||3|| |0|| |0
|-
|-
|| 11 || |DF ||align=left| Brad Smith || |1|| |0|| |0|| |0|| |0|| |0|| |0|| |0|| |0|| |0|| |0|| |0|||1|| |0|| |0
|-
|-
|| 14 || |DF ||align=left| Chad Marshall || |0|| |0|| |1|| |0|| |0|| |0|| |0|| |0|| |0|| |0|| |0|| |0|||0|| |0|| |1
|-
|-
|| 15 || |DF ||align=left| Tony Alfaro || |2|| |1|| |0|| |0|| |0|| |0|| |0|| |0|| |0|| |0|| |0|| |0|||2|| |1|| |0
|-
|-
|| 16 || |MF ||align=left| Alex Roldan || |2|| |0|| |0|| |0|| |0|| |0|| |1|| |0|| |0|| |0|| |0|| |0|||3|| |0|| |0
|-
|-
|| 17 || |FW ||align=left|  Will Bruin || |1|| |0|| |0|| |0|| |0|| |0|| |0|| |0|| |0|| |0|| |0|| |0|||1|| |0|| |0
|-
|-
|| 18 || |DF ||align=left| Kelvin Leerdam || |4|| |0|| |1|| |0|| |0|| |0|| |0|| |0|| |0|| |0|| |0|| |0|||4|| |0|| |1
|-
|-
|| 19 || |FW ||align=left|  Harry Shipp || |1|| |0|| |0|| |0|| |0|| |0|| |0|| |0|| |0|| |0|| |0|| |0|||1|| |0|| |0
|-
|-
|| 20 || |DF ||align=left| Kim Kee-Hee || |4|| |0|| |0|| |0|| |0|| |0|| |0|| |0|| |0|| |0|| |0|| |0|||4|| |0|| |0
|-
|-
|| 21 || |MF ||align=left| Jordy Delem || |5|| |0|| |0|| |0|| |0|| |0|| |0|| |0|| |0|| |1|| |0|| |0|||6|| |0|| |0
|-
|-
|| 22 || |MF ||align=left| Magnus Wolff Eikrem || |2|| |0|| |0|| |0|| |0|| |0|| |0|| |0|| |0|| |0|| |0|| |0|||2|| |0|| |0
|-
|-
|| 23 || |MF ||align=left| Henry Wingo || |1|| |0|| |0|| |0|| |0|| |0|| |0|| |0|| |0|| |0|| |0|| |0|||1|| |0|| |0
|-
|-
|| 24 || |GK ||align=left| Stefan Frei || |1|| |0|| |0|| |0|| |0|| |0|| |0|| |0|| |0|| |0|| |0|| |0|||1|| |0|| |0
|-
|-
|| 27 || |FW ||align=left| Lamar Neagle || |1|| |0|| |0|| |0|| |0|| |0|| |0|| |0|| |0|| |0|| |0|| |0|||1|| |0|| |0
|-
|-
|| 29 || |DF ||align=left| Roman Torres || |1|| |0|| |0|| |0|| |0|| |0|| |0|| |0|| |0|| |1|| |0|| |0|||2|| |0|| |0
|-
|-
|| 30 || |DF ||align=left| Jordan McCrary || |2|| |1|| |0|| |0|| |0|| |0|| |0|| |0|| |0|| |2|| |0|| |0|||4|| |1|| |0
|-
|-
|| 71 || |FW ||align=left| David Olsen [S2]|| |0|| |0|| |0|| |0|| |0|| |0|| |1|| |0|| |0|| |0|| |0|| |0|||1|| |0|| |0
|-
|-
|| 90 || |DF ||align=left| Waylon Francis || |1|| |0|| |0|| |0|| |0|| |0|| |0|| |0|| |0|| |1|| |0|| |0|||2|| |0|| |0
|-
|-
|| 92 || |DF ||align=left| Rodrigue Ele [S2]|| |0|| |0|| |0|| |0|| |0|| |0|| |1|| |0|| |0|| |0|| |0|| |0|||1|| |0|| |0
|-
|-
|| 99 || |FW ||align=left| Felix Chenkam || |0|| |0|| |0|| |0|| |0|| |0|| |1|| |0|| |0|| |0|| |0|| |0|||1|| |0|| |0
|-
!colspan=3|Total !!54!!2!!3!!3!!0!!0!!4!!0!!0!!8!!0!!0!!69!!2!!3

Honors and awards

MLS Team of the Week 

Bold indicates Audi Player Index Spotlight

MLS Coach of the Week

MLS Goal of the Week

MLS Best XI

MLS Save of the Year

Transfers 

For transfers in, dates listed are when Sounders FC officially signed the players to the roster. Transactions where only the rights to the players are acquired are not listed. For transfers out, dates listed are when Sounders FC officially removed the players from its roster, not when they signed with another club. If a player later signed with another club, his new club will be noted, but the date listed here remains the one when he was officially removed from Sounders FC roster.

In

Draft picks 

Draft picks are not automatically signed to the team roster. Only those who are signed to a contract will be listed as transfers in. Only trades involving draft picks and executed after the start of 2018 MLS SuperDraft will be listed in the notes.

Out

Notes 
A.  Players who are under contract with Seattle Sounders FC 2.

References

Seattle Sounders FC seasons
Seattle Sounders
Seattle
Seattle
Seattle